Edward Youngblood (born August 8, 1939) is an American politician and banker from Maine. Youngblood, a Republican from Brewer, served as State Senator from Maine's 31st District, representing part of Penobscot and Hancock counties, including the population centers of Bucksport and Brewer. He was first elected to the Maine State Senate in 2000 and served until 2004. He was re-elected after Richard Rosen was unable to run for re-election due to term-limits in 2012.

He has served as Senior Vice President of Bangor Savings Bank since 1975.

He earned a B.S. from Husson College in 1961 and graduated from the Graduate School of Banking of Fairfield University in 1983.

He withdrew from his 2014 reelection bid, citing the difficulty of traveling between Augusta and Brewer every day the Legislature was in session, along with his age.  He cited passage of a large energy bill as his greatest accomplishment.

References

1939 births
Living people
Republican Party Maine state senators
People from Piscataquis County, Maine
People from Brewer, Maine
Husson University alumni
Fairfield University alumni
21st-century American politicians